The Web Standards Project (WaSP) was a group of professional web developers dedicated to disseminating and encouraging the use of the web standards recommended by the World Wide Web Consortium, along with other groups and standards bodies.

Founded in 1998, The Web Standards Project campaigned for standards that reduced the cost and complexity of development while increasing the accessibility and long-term viability of any document published on the Web. WaSP worked with browser companies, authoring tool makers, and peers to encourage them to use these standards, since they "are carefully designed to deliver the greatest benefits to the greatest number of web users". The group disbanded in 2013.

Organization

The Web Standards Project began as a grassroots coalition "fighting for standards in our [web] browsers" founded by George Olsen, Glenn Davis, and Jeffrey Zeldman in August 1998. By 2001, the group had achieved its primary goal of persuading Microsoft, Netscape, Opera, and other browser makers to accurately and completely support HTML 4.01/XHTML 1.0, CSS1, and ECMAScript. Had browser makers not been persuaded to do so, the Web would likely have fractured into pockets of incompatible content, with various websites available only to people who possessed the right browser. In addition to streamlining web development and significantly lowering its cost, support for common web standards enabled the development of the semantic web. By marking up content in semantic (X)HTML, front-end developers make a site's content more available to search engines, more accessible to people with disabilities, and more available to the world beyond the desktop (e.g. mobile).

The project relaunched in June 2002 with new members, a redesigned website, new site features, and a redefined mission focused on developer education and standards compliance in authoring tools as well as browsers.

Project leaders were:
 George Olsen (1998–1999)
 Jeffrey Zeldman (1999–2002)
 Steven Champeon (2002–2004)
 Molly Holzschlag (2004–2006)
 Kimberly Blessing and Drew McLellan (2006–2008)
 Derek Featherstone, Aaron Gustafson, and Glenda Sims (2008–2013)

There were members that were invited to work on ad hoc initiatives, the Buzz Blog and other content areas of the site.

The group announced its dissolution on March 1, 2013.

Task forces 
The Web Standards Project hosted projects focused on bringing relevant organizations closer to standards-compliance, dubbed Task Forces.

Adobe Task Force Focused on improving web standards compliance in products from Adobe Systems. Was named the Dreamweaver Task Force until 2008-03-10.
Education Task Force  Worked with institutions of higher education to promote instruction of Web standards and standards-compliant public sites.
 Microsoft Task Force Worked with the Internet Explorer and Web platform tools team.
 Accessibility Task Force Worked with organizations, vendors and others to promote Web accessibility.
 International Liaison Group A member was "an active advocate for Web standards and best practices either in their country of origin or domicile."
 The Street Team Organized community events to promote web standards.
DOM Scripting Task Force Focused on interoperable client-side scripting, through explaining and promoting the DOM standards from W3C and the ECMAScript Standard, and concepts like progressive enhancement, graceful degradation, accessibility, standards-driven JavaScript. These best practice approaches have been called "DOM scripting" to differentiate them from earlier perceived bad uses of "Dynamic HTML". The task force became inactive before the group disbanded.

Activities 
 The Acid1 test allows browsers and other rendering engines to test compliance with HTML 4 and CSS 1 specifications.
 The Acid2 test allows browsers and other rendering engines to test compliance with CSS 1 and 2 specifications.
 The Acid3 test allows browsers and other rendering engines to test compliance with CSS 2.1, DOM, and EcmaScript specifications.

See also 
A List Apart
Browse Happy
WebPlatform
CSS Zen Garden

References

External links

The Web Standards Project Education Task Force
Archive: The Web Standards Project's baseline standards proposal
Archive: The Web Standards Project's historical "goodbye" page

Organizations established in 1998
Organizations disestablished in 2013
Web standards
Internet-related organizations
Volunteer organizations